The Volkswagen Santana is a nameplate used by Volkswagen for various sedans and station wagons since 1983. The first generation is based on the second-generation Volkswagen Passat (B2). It was introduced in 1981 while production started in 1983 for China and 1984 for Europe. The use of the "Santana" badge rather than "Passat" echoes the use of different names for the sedan versions of the Polo (Derby) and Golf (Jetta).

In North America, it was also known as the Volkswagen Quantum. In Mexico, it was named the Volkswagen Corsar, while in Argentina it was sold as the Volkswagen Carat. In Brazil and other South American countries it was known as the Santana, while the Passat Variant B2 wagon was marketed as the Quantum. In Europe, the Santana name was dropped in 1985 (with the exception of Spain, where the Santana nameplate was retained) and the car was sold as a Passat. European test production ended in 1988 while Latin American production continued until 2006. Chinese production of the three box sedan continued until December 2012.

The final Chinese versions were named Santana Vista, and the name Santana was used on a new 2013 model, slightly smaller and based on the Škoda Rapid and SEAT Toledo.



Santana (China; 1983–2022)

First generation (B2; 1983) 

The Santana's biggest success was in China. The Santana (B2) had been built in China on a small scale trial basis by the Shanghai Tractor Automobile Corporation (STAC), predecessor of the SAIC Motor, since 1982. The first 100 cars were built from CKD kits delivered from Germany. The first Volkswagen Santana was assembled in April 1983 by a team from Shanghai Auto. Volkswagen signed a contract with STAC, along with the China National Automotive Industry Corporation (CNAIC) and the Bank of China to form the Shanghai Volkswagen Automotive joint venture in October 1984. Production commenced in September 1985 while the first assembly line of the Santana started a month later. In September 1986, the 10,000th Santana was built in China. The car and venture laid the ground-works for China's mass motorization. The drive to fully localize production became the impetus for the Chinese auto parts industry: In 1986, the quota of made-in-China parts was below six percent. In 1995, the local content quota stood at 89 percent.

Initially launched with a 1.6-litre petrol engine, the Santana was updated with a 1.8-litre petrol in 1987, first available in the Santana Variant station wagon introduced by Shanghai in April 1992. The first Santanas were all originally equipped with a four-speed manual transmission. This vehicle was very popular as a taxicab, having been in service dating back to 1987, along with policecars and other government services. 
The Santana has had a number of updated features added since the original 1983 model. Some updated features the Santana has been include with are Bosch electronic fuel injection system, a 5-speed manual, a third brake light, improved back seats, hydraulic clutch, MP3 and CD compatible radios, ABS brakes with electronic brake distribution.

Second generation (2000; 1995)

In 1991 the Santana 2000 was put into development for China with the aid of Volkswagen do Brasil. It was introduced in 1994 and started mass production in April 1995 with a longer wheelbase and rear doors than its Brazilian counterpart.

Facelift (3000; 2004)

On March 2 2004, Shanghai Volkswagen Automotive introduced a heavily facelifted Santana 2000, the Santana 3000. It was the first design that the Shanghai Volkswagen Automotive joint venture designers had undertaken by themselves.  The Santana 3000 was also the first in the Chinese developed Santana series to be available with optional ABS brakes with electronic brake distribution, electronic differential system, a multi function display system, and a sunroof designed by the German Webasto company. The 2.0-litre engine was added to the range in June 2006.

Second facelift (Vista; 2008)

On January 6 2008, Shanghai Volkswagen Automotive released the Santana Vista (Zhijun) and Santana Vista (Changda) (Taxi model), featuring front and rear visual updates and minor chassis modifications. The passenger version of the Vista can be recognized by its mesh grille, chrome accents located low on the bumpers, and redesigned taillights with circular elements whereas the taxi version had a razor blade-like grille, same taillights like the Santana 3000 and new wheels.

 the original German designed Santana (both sedan and Variant versions) was still sold in China alongside the updated Santana Vista, which were popular with taxi and police fleets, as well as with private buyers. A 1.6-litre version of the Santana Vista (1,595 cc) has been added to the bottom of the lineup to further boost sales. There were 3,213,710 units made since CKD production began in 1983 up until May 2009. Nonetheless, Shanghai Volkswagen Automotive decided to discontinue the Santana in 2012. Production is still continuing in China with the Santana sedan and Gran Santana hatchback. The classic Santana Vista taxi was phased out in October 2018 in favour of 100 new electric cabs for Shanghai's taxi fleet as well as the Volkswagen Touran, which offered greater comfort for passengers.

Third generation (A05; 2012) 

On October 29, 2012, the new Santana was introduced in Wolfsburg, Germany as a small family/C-segment car. It was built to fulfill the Chinese market demand. The new Santana is built in Anting and Ürümqi in China and its basis uses the Volkswagen Group A05+ platform, sharing the same platform as the Volkswagen New Jetta, another Chinese built Volkswagen model.

The New Santana has been redesigned for more power and a sleeker design.

Production for the New Santana commenced in December 2012. A hatchback variant is known as the Gran Santana and has been sold after the facelift since June 2015. The Cross Santana was launched a year later.

In May 2018, the Santana - along with the Tiguan, Lavida, and  Lamando - was launched in the Philippines as part of the new ASEAN-China Free Trade Agreement (ACFTA).

Gallery

Santana (Japan; 1984–1989) 

Aiming at a full partnership with Volkswagen, Nissan's then President Takashi Ishihara decided that producing the Santana for the Japanese market would be a good stepping stone. Negotiations began in 1981, and by February 1984, Nissan begun knock-down kit production of the Santana at its Zama plant in Kanagawa, Japan. The Santana received the internal model code M30. The price of the Santana was considerably lower than of imported Volkswagens.

Nissan's Santana was changed for Japan with a right hand drive wiper layout (parking on the passenger side) which, as well as a new linkage mechanism, also required a new bonnet pressing as there were recesses in the trailing edge for the wiper pivots. VW-built cars, in common with some of the maker's other models at this time, such as the MKII Golf, had the same LHD wiper pattern regardless of steering wheel location. At introduction, the Santana was available with three different engines: A  1781 cc four (Li, Gi), a  1,994 cc five (Gi5, Xi5) and a  1,588 cc turbodiesel four (Lt, Gt Diesel Turbo). All came with a five-speed manual transmission as standard, while the gasoline engines were also available with a three-speed automatic. The Santana was 5 mm narrower than its German counterparts, so as to avoid a massive Japanese tax on cars wider than 1690 mm. Additionally, the grille and headlights were unique to the M30 Santana.

In May 1985 the Xi5 Autobahn version was added to the lineup, offering velour sports seats, electric sunroof and 14-inch alloy wheels. In January 1987 the Santana received a facelift, with a new fascia and new larger bumpers. The Turbodiesel was discontinued, leaving only gasoline-engined versions. With sales, originally aimed at 4,000-5,000 per month, only having reached 50,000 over seven years, Nissan ended production in October 1989. Sales of remaining stock continued until May 1990. Instead of renewing the production license, they began selling the new third-generation Volkswagen Passat through their dealer network. As Volkswagen and Toyota began cooperating in 1991, sales of Volkswagens through Nissan dealers came to a halt.

Santana (Brazil; 1984–2006)

The Santana entered production in Brazil in June, 1984. It was originally sold as a 4-door and 2-door sedan, but a station wagon named Santana Quantum (later simply Quantum) was launched in July 1985. The 2-door coupe was exclusive to Brazil.

The engine range consisted of two versions of the familiar 1.8-litre Volkswagen EA827 engine, running on ethanol or petrol.  In May 1988 it gained the option of a 2.0-litre engine (petrol or ethanol).  Thus equipped they were known as Santana/Quantum 2000. Transmissions included a 4-speed manual (for the first two years), 5-speed manual (first as an option but made standard in 1987), and for the top line CD (later GLS) a 3-speed automatic.

In 1991, Volkswagen do Brasil then engaged in a joint venture with Ford called AutoLatina, decided to retain the Passat (B2) shaped sedan and wagon instead of building the newer third-generation Passat (B3). Thorough changes to the bodyshell, boot line, front and rear guards, meant it looked considerably more modern than its predecessor, if not quite at par with the B3. Under the terms of AutoLatina, this "new" Santana was also marketed as the Ford Versailles in Brazil and as the Ford Galaxy in Argentina. The 3-door (later 5-door) station wagon was sold as the Ford Royale. 1991 also marked the introduction of ABS brakes and catalytic converters, both firsts for the Brazilian car industry.

It received a mild facelift for 1994, and another more extensive one in 1998. In 2002, the Quantum was taken out of production, and then, after more than two decades and years of dropping sales, the Santana was retired from the range in June 2006. It sold 548,494 units during its production run.

Corsar (Mexico; 1984–1988)

The Santana was launched to the Mexican car market in February 1984 as the all-new Corsar CD. Assembled at VW Mexico's Puebla factory mostly with German-sourced components, for the brand it was intended to be the top-of-range offer for the domestic car market at the time, a mechanically reliable while slightly luxurious medium sedan. The 1.8-litre  carbureted engine was the only drive choice for the whole Corsar lineup through its lifetime. It was definitely a high fuel-saving option toward its local medium-luxury competitors: Chrysler LeBaron "K", Chevrolet Celebrity, Ford Grand Marquis, Renault 18.

In 1984 and 1985, the Corsar was marketed only as 4-door sedan, the same European Santana body (no Passat Variant body was offered here for those first years), matching the appearance of the US's market version (badged there as VW Quantum). At the time, the Corsar and Quantum sedans shared the same front grille design, featuring four squared headlight units (two beams for the right and left sides with amber colored rectangular emergency indicators below each) rather than the Santana's grille design.

Regarding equipment, only one trim level was available, which included: 13” alloy wheels, 185/70 tires, velour upholstery (gray or blue coloured starting in 1985), rear seat headrests, AM/FM stereo cassette Radio with 4 speakers, tachometer, power steering, anti-theft alarm. Air condition was available as an option, as well as 4-speed manual transmission or 3-speed automatic gearboxes. The following colours were available for 1984: Mars Red, Alpine White, Jade Green Metallic, Cosmos Silver Metallic and Graphite Metallic.

For 1986, the Corsar's product range received several novelties, somewhat similar to the North-American Quantum line. First, the headlights and front grille design was updated to match the same featured by the correspondent European Passat line. New body colours and upholstery types were now offered, a new 5-speed manual gearbox replaced the previous 4-speed one. Some new features were now available as option equipment, mainly power door locks and windows and black leather upholstery. In March 1986, the Passat wagon body was now offered within the local lineup, being badged here as Corsar Variant (matching the European Passat Variant or Quantum Wagon, as known in United States and Brazil).

The 1987 and 1988 Corsar lineup remained mostly unchanged, just bringing out then that the alloy wheels where now offered as part of the option package, with a set of steel-made wheels wearing full covers being now the standard ones.

By mid-1988, a limited edition Corsar was released (both sedan and Variant version). It was distinguished for its Black and Silver double-tone paintwork, black leather upholstery and full equipment. Finally, by the end of 1988, the Corsar was discontinued from Volkswagen Mexico lineup, since production of its German counterpart -the Santana/Passat Mk2- stopped in Europe (where most of the matching parts came from, and rather started producing the next gen Passat Mk3). Also, the local assembly lines were needed by VW to increase the production run of the Mk2 Golf/Jetta for United States and Canada exports. In Mexico, the Corsar is still well remembered as a sleek design, good reputation vehicle.

Carat (Argentina; 1987–1991)

The Santana 4-door sedan started production in Argentina in June, 1987 as the  Carat, manufactured by Volkswagen Argentina S.A. (San Justo/General Pacheco, Buenos Aires Province). No 2-door or estate versions were produced. Production ended in 1991.

References

External links

 (Philippines)
 (Philippines - Santana GTS)

Santana
Mid-size cars
Sedans
Rally cars
1980s cars
Front-wheel-drive vehicles
Taxi vehicles
1990s cars
2000s cars
2010s cars
Cars of Brazil
Cars of China